This is a list of Japanese football J3 League transfers in the winter transfer window 2019–20 by club.

J3 League

Kagoshima United FC

In:

Out:

FC Gifu

In:

Out:

Fujieda MYFC

In:

Out:

Kataller Toyama

In:

Out:

Roasso Kumamoto

In:

Out:

Gainare Tottori

In:

Out:

Blaublitz Akita

In:

Out:

Nagano Parceiro

In:

Out:

Vanraure Hachinohe

In:

Out:

Fukushima United FC

In:

Out:

Azul Claro Numazu

In:

Out:

YSCC Yokohama

In:

Out:

Kamatamare Sanuki

In:

Out:

SC Sagamihara

In:

Out:

Iwate Grulla Morioka

In:

Out:

FC Imabari

In:

Out:

References

2019-20
Transfers
Japan